is a Japanese football club playing in the Kanto Soccer League, one of the Japanese Regional Leagues.

History
The club was founded in 1961 as Zainichi Chosen Football Club. Initially it maintained links with Chongryon, the pro-North Korea organization of Koreans in Japan, and recruited talent through the Korea University sports program.

Following the admission of the abductions of Japanese people by North Korean Leader Kim Jong-il in 2002, however, the club severed links with Chongryon and adopted the name Football Club Korea, using the English pronunciation of the name of the peninsula (see Names of Korea). The club adopted a pan-Korean identity in order to attract players affiliated with the South.

In 2008 FC Korea was promoted to the Kanto League Second Division and in 2010 they were promoted to the First Division. They have announced intentions to potentially become a J.League club; however, given the saturation of clubs in the Kanto region and professional clubs in the AFC requiring squads with most players holding domestic nationality, progress is unlikely.

Zainichi Koreans international side 

In 2015, the United Korean Football Association in Japan (UKFAJ), an organization intended to promote the participation of the Korean diaspora in football on a wider basis, was founded, with a view to the formation of a dedicated Zainichi football team. This was achieved in November 2015, when the UKFAJ joined ConIFA, an organization designed to facilitate teams that represent unrecognized nations, sub-national entities and stateless peoples in playing international football. The team representing the Zainichi people is based primarily around the FC Korea team. This team was subsequently selected as one of the twelve qualifiers for the 2016 ConIFA World Football Cup where it came in eight.

Current squad
Squad for the 2022 season. Updated as of 23 March 2022.

References

External links
 
 

Association football clubs established in 1961
Korea
Football clubs in Japan
Zainichi Korean culture
1961 establishments in Japan
Korea